Glück (transliterated Glueck) is the surname of:
Arie Gill-Gluck (1930–2016), Israeli Olympic runner
 Alois Glück (born 1940), German politician
 Bernard Glueck (disambiguation), several people with this name
 Christian Friedrich von Glück (1755–1831), German jurist
 Eleanor Glueck (1898–1972), American criminologist and wife of Sheldon Glueck
 George Glueck (born 1950), German music producer and artist manager
 Grace Glueck (1926–2022), American art journalist
 Gustav Glück (1871–1952), Austrian art historian
 Helen Iglauer Glueck (1907–1995), American physician
 Johann Ernst Glück (1652–1705), German translator and Lutheran theologian
 Larry Glueck (born 1941), American football (NFL) defensive back
 Louise Glück (born 1943), American poet
 Nelson Glueck (1900–1971), American rabbi, academic and archaeologist
 Sheldon Glueck (1896–1980), Polish American criminologist
 Wolfgang Glück (born 1929), Austrian film director and screenwriter

Gluck is the surname of:
 Alma Gluck (Reba Feinsohn) (1884–1938), a Romanian-American soprano
 Barbara Gluck (born 1938), American photographer
 Carol Gluck (born 1941), American historian of modern Japan
 Christoph Willibald Gluck (1714–1787), one of the most important opera composers of the Classical music era
 Earle J. Gluck (1900–1972), American radio pioneer
 Edgar Gluck (born 1936), rabbi in Galicia
 Frederick Gluck (born 1935), American management consultant
 Henry Gluck (born 1929), American business executive and philanthropist from Los Angeles, California. 
 Herschel Gluck, British rabbi
 Jay Gluck (1927–2000), American archaeologist and art historian
 Louis Gluck (1924–1997), American neonatologist
 Malcolm Gluck, British wine writer
 Mark A. Gluck, American professor of neuroscience
 Maxwell Henry Gluck (1899–1984), American businessman, diplomat, thoroughbred horse breeder and philanthropist
 Michael Gluck (born 1983), American pianist
 Peter L. Gluck, American architect
 Rita Buglass Gluck, American writer
 Robert Gluck (born 1955), American pianist and composer
 Salomon Gluck (1914–1944), French physician and member of the French Resistance
 Themistocles Gluck (1853–1942), German physician
 Will Gluck, American film director, screenwriter, and producer

See also
 Richard Glücks (1889–1945), a German Nazi official and Holocaust perpetrator
 Andrej Glucks (born 1976), Croatian slalom canoer
 Glack, Glock
 Gluek (disambiguation)
 Glick

German-language surnames
Jewish surnames